is a Japanese professional wrestler currently working for the Japanese promotion World Wonder Ring Stardom. She is also known for her time in Ice Ribbon and Actwres girl'Z.

Professional wrestling career

Japanese independent circuit (2019–2021) 
Beginning as a freelancer, Kohgo is known for competing in multiple promotions of the Japanese independent scene. She competed in one of Pro Wrestling Wave's signature events, the 2021 Young Block Oh! Oh! division of the Catch the Wave tournament where she competed in the "Block A", scoring a total of two points after going against Tomoka Inaba, Ami Miura and Shizuku Tsukata. At New Ice Ribbon #1013 ~ RibbonMania 2019, an event promoted by Ice Ribbon on December 30, 2019, Kohgo competed in Tequila Saya's retirement 44-person gauntlet match which ended in a time-limit draw and also involved notable opponents such as Ken Ohka, Munenori Sawa, Manami Toyota, Ram Kaicho, Rina Shingaki, Matsuya Uno and many others. She is also known for competing in the "P's Party" branch of events. At Ice Ribbon P's Party #75 on May 19, 2021, she fell short to Madeline in a number one contender's match for the IW19 Championship.

Actwres girl'Z (2019–2021) 
Kohgo made her professional wrestling debut on April 30, 2019, at Actwres girl'Z show AWG Actwres girl'Z In Korakuen where she fell short to Noa Igarashi. During her time in the promotion, she challenged for various titles such as the AWG Tag Team Championship by teaming up with Momo Tani at AWG Act 54 on September 25, 2021, in a losing effort against Kakeru Sekiguchi and Miku Aono.

Consejo Mundial de Lucha Libre (2021)
In the autumn of 2021, Kohgo had an excursion to the Mexican independent scene as she competed in several events promoted by Consejo Mundial de Lucha Libre. She participated in the CMLL Women's Grand Prix, teaming up with Tsukasa Fujimoto and Tsukushi as "Team Japan" and competing against Team Mexico (Marcela, La Amapola, La Jarochita, Princesa Sugehit, Dark Silueta, Lluvia, and Reyna Isis) and Team World (Dalys la Caribeña, Avispa Dorada, Stephanie Vaquer and Sonya).

World Wonder Ring Stardom (2022–present) 
At Stardom in Osaka event from January 23, 2022, Kohgo requested Stars members to let her join the unit which the latters accepted. At Stardom Nagoya Supreme Fight on January 29, 2022, she defeated Oedo Tai's Fukigen Death, Ruaka, Saki Kashima and Rina in an elimination five-way match. At Stardom Cinderella Journey on February 23, 2022, Kohgo unsuccessfully challenged stablemate Hanan for the Future of Stardom Championship. At Stardom New Blood 1 on March 11, 2022, she defeated Gatoh Move Pro Wrestling's Sayaka in a singles match. On the first night of the Stardom World Climax 2022 from March 26, she teamed up with Cosmic Angels (Waka Tsukiyama and Mina Shirakawa) to compete in a six-woman tag team gauntlet match won by Donna Del Mondo (Himeka, Natsupoi, and Mai Sakurai) and also involving Queen's Quest (AZM, Lady C and Miyu Amasaki), and Oedo Tai (Saki Kashima, Ruaka and Rina). On the second night from March 27, she participated in a 18-women Cinderella Rumble match won by Mei Suruga and also featuring various wrestlers who competed at New Blood 1 such as Haruka Umesaki, Nanami, Maria, Ai Houzan, and Yuna Mizumori, and many others. At Stardom Cinderella Tournament 2022, Kohgo unsuccessfully faced stablemate Mayu Iwatani in the first round matches from April 3. At Stardom Golden Week Fight Tour on May 5, 2022, she teamed up with Hanan and Saya Iida to defeat Oedo Tai's Saki Kashima, Ruaka and Rina. At Stardom New Blood 2 on May 13, 2022, she teamed up with Iida in a losing effort against Rina Amikura and Yuko Sakurai. At Stardom Flashing Champions on May 28, 2022, Kohgo teamed up with Iida and Lady C and picked up a victory over Ami Sourei, Rina and Hina. At Stardom Fight in the Top on June 26, 2022, she teamed up with Iida to defeat Miyu Amasaki and Lady C. At Stardom New Blood 3 on July 8, 2022, she teamed up with Iida and Hana to defeat JTO (Tomoka Inaba, Aoi and Misa Kagura). At Mid Summer Champions in Tokyo, the first event of the Stardom Mid Summer Champions series which took place on July 9, 2022, Kohgo unsuccessfully challenged AZM for the High Speed Championship. At Mid Summer Champions in Nagoya on July 24, she teamed up with Mayu Iwatani to defeat Fukigen Death and Ruaka. At Stardom in Showcase vol.1 on July 25, 2022, she participated in a Nagoya rumble match won by Fukigen Death. Kohgo failed to qualify for the Stardom 5 Star Grand Prix 2022 after she participated in a qualifier block where she scored a total of four points after facing Ami Sourei, Miyu Amasaki, Rina and Waka Tsukiyama. At Stardom x Stardom: Nagoya Midsummer Encounter on August 21, 2022, she teamed up with Saya Iida and Mayu Iwatani in a losing effort against Queen's Quest (Utami Hayashishita, AZM and Lady C). At Stardom New Blood 4 on August 26, 2022, she teamed up with Iida in a losing effort against Mai Sakurai and Linda.

Championships and accomplishments 
 World Wonder Ring Stardom
 Stardom Year-End Award (1 time)
 Best Unit Award (2022)

References

Living people
1985 births
Japanese female professional wrestlers
People from Saitama Prefecture
Sportspeople from Saitama Prefecture
21st-century professional wrestlers